Landing Ship, Tank (LST), or tank landing ship, is the naval designation for ships first developed during World War II (1939–1945) to support amphibious operations by carrying tanks, vehicles, cargo, and landing troops directly onto shore with no docks or piers. This enabled amphibious assaults on almost any beach.

The LST had a highly specialized design that enabled ocean crossings as well as shore groundings.  The bow had a large door that could open, deploy a ramp and unload vehicles. The LST had a flat keel that allowed the ship to be beached and stay upright. The twin propellers and rudders had protection from grounding. The LSTs served across the globe during World War II including in the Pacific War and in the European theatre.

The first tank-landing ships were built to British requirements by converting existing ships; the UK and the US then collaborated upon a joint design. The British ships were used in late 1942 during the Allied invasion of Algeria, by 1943 LSTs participated in the invasion of Sicily and mainland Italy. In June 1944 they were part of the huge invasion fleet for the Normandy landings.

Over 1,000 LSTs were laid down in the United States during World War II for use by the Allies; the United Kingdom and Canada produced eighty more.

LST Mk.1

Maracaibo landing ships
The British evacuation from Dunkirk in 1940 demonstrated to the Admiralty that the Allies needed relatively large, ocean-going ships that could handle shore-to-shore delivery of tanks and other vehicles in amphibious assaults upon the continent of Europe. As an interim measure, three 4,000- to 4,800-GRT "Lake tankers", built to pass over the restrictive bars of Lake Maracaibo, Venezuela, were selected for conversion because of their shallow draft. They later proved their worth during the invasion of Algeria in 1942, but their bluff bows made for inadequate speed and pointed out the need for an all-new design incorporating a sleeker hull.

Boxer-class 
It was a scaled-down design from ideas penned by Prime Minister Winston Churchill. As a result, each of the three (and ) ordered in March 1941 had a very long ramp stowed behind the bow doors.

The ships were built at Harland and Wolff from 1941 and completed in 1943. Bruiser and Thruster took part in the Salerno landings

All three were intended to be converted to fighter direction ships in order to have ground-controlled interception of enemy aircraft during landing operations but only Boxer was converted.

The U.S. were to build seven LST (1) but in light of the problems with the design and progress with the LST Mark II the plans were cancelled. Construction of the LST (1)s took until 1943 and the first US LST (2) was launched before them.

LST Mk.2

Development
At their first meeting at the Atlantic Conference in Argentia, Newfoundland, in August 1941, President Franklin D. Roosevelt and Prime Minister Winston Churchill confirmed the Admiralty's views. In November 1941, a small delegation from the Admiralty arrived in the United States to pool ideas with the United States Navy's Bureau of Ships with regard to development of ships and the possibility of building further Boxers in the US. During this meeting, it was decided that the Bureau of Ships would design these vessels. As with the standing agreement, these ships would be built by the US so British shipyards could concentrate on building vessels for the Royal Navy. The specifications called for vessels capable of crossing the Atlantic, and the original title given to them was "Atlantic Tank Landing Craft" (Atlantic (T.L.C.)).

The LST (2) design incorporated elements of the first British LCTs from their designer, Sir Rowland Baker, who was part of the British delegation. One of the elements provided for sufficient buoyancy in the ships' sidewalls so that they would float the ship even when the tank deck was flooded. The LST (2) gave up the speed of HMS Boxer, at only , but carried a similar load while drawing only  forward when beaching.

Design

Within a few days, John C. Niedermair of the Bureau of Ships sketched out an awkward looking ship that proved to be the basic design for the more than 1,000 LST (2) that were built during World War II. To meet the conflicting requirements of deep draft for ocean travel and shallow draft for beaching, the ship was designed with a large ballast system that could be filled for ocean passage and pumped out for beaching operations. An anchor and mechanical winch system also aided in the ship's ability to pull itself off the beach. The rough sketch was sent to Britain on 5 November 1941 and accepted immediately. The Admiralty then requested that the United States build 200 "LST (2)" for the Royal Navy under the terms of lend-lease.

This scheme distributed the ship's weight over a greater area, enabling her to ride higher in the water when in landing trim. The LST could carry a  load of tanks and vehicles. By January 1942, the first scale model of the LST had been built and was undergoing tests at the David Taylor Model Basin in Washington, D.C.

Provisions were made for the satisfactory ventilation of the tank space while the tank motors were running, and an elevator was provided to lower vehicles from the main deck to the tank deck for disembarking. In April 1942 a mock-up of the well-deck of an LST was constructed at Fort Knox, Kentucky, to resolve the problem of ventilation within the LST well-deck. The interior of the building was constructed to duplicate all the features found within an actual LST. Being the home to the Armored Force Board, Fort Knox supplied tanks to run on the inside while Naval architects developed a ventilation system capable of evacuating the well-deck of harmful gases. Testing was completed in three months. This historic building remains at Fort Knox today.

Early LST operations required overcoming the 18th-century language of the Articles for the Government of the United States Navy: "He who doth suffer his ships to founder on rocks and shoals shall be punished..."

Production

The LST(2) was built as the LST-1 class and the LST-491 class.

In three separate acts dated 6 February 1942, 26 May 1943, and 17 December 1943, Congress provided the authority for the construction of LSTs along with a host of other auxiliaries, destroyer escorts, and assorted landing craft. The enormous building program quickly gathered momentum. Such a high priority was assigned to the construction of LSTs that the previously laid keel of an aircraft carrier was hastily removed to make room for several LSTs to be built in her place. The keel of the first LST was laid down on 10 June 1942 at Newport News, Virginia, and the first standardized LSTs were floated out of their building dock in October. Twenty-three were in commission by the end of 1942.

The LST building program was unique in several respects. As soon as the basic design had been developed, contracts were let and construction was commenced in quantity before the completion of a test vessel. Preliminary orders were rushed out verbally or by telegrams, telephone, and air mail letters. The ordering of certain materials actually preceded the completion of design work. While many heavy equipment items, such as main propulsion machinery, were furnished directly by the Navy, the balance of the procurement was handled centrally by the Material Coordinating Agency—an adjunct of the Bureau of Ships—so that the numerous builders in the program would not have to bid against one another. Through vigorous follow-up action on materials ordered, the agency made possible the completion of construction schedules in record time.

The need for LSTs was urgent, and the program enjoyed a high priority throughout the war. Since most shipbuilding activities were located in coastal yards that were mainly used for construction of large, deep-draft ships, new construction facilities for the LSTs were established along inland waterways, some converted from heavy-industry plants, such as steel fabrication yards. Shifting the vessels was complicated by bridges across waterways, many of which were modified by the Navy to permit passage. A dedicated Navy "Ferry Command" orchestrated the transportation of newly constructed ships to coastal ports for final fitting out. Of the 1,051 LSTs built during the war, 670 were supplied by five "cornfield shipyards" in the Middle West. Dravo Corporation's facility at Neville Island, Pennsylvania, designated the lead shipyard for the project, built 145 vessels and developed fabrication techniques that reduced construction time and costs at all of the LST shipyards. The Missouri Valley Bridge & Iron Co. built the most LSTs of any shipyard, with 171 constructed at Evansville, Indiana. Chicago Bridge and Iron's shipyard in Seneca, Illinois, launched 156 ships and was specifically chosen because of their reputation and skills, particularly in welding. The American Bridge Company in Ambridge, Pennsylvania, built 119.

Modifications
By 1943, the construction time for an LST had been reduced to four months. By the end of the war, this had been cut to two months. Considerable effort was expended to hold the ship's design constant, but, by mid-1943, operating experience led to the incorporation of certain changes in the new ships.

From LST-513, the elevator to transfer equipment between the tank deck and the main deck was replaced with a  ramp that was hinged at the main deck. This allowed vehicles to be driven directly from the main deck down to the tank deck and then across the bow ramp to the beach or causeway, speeding the process of disembarkation.

LST Mk.3

Design
The LST (2) design was successful and production extensive, but there was still a need for more LSTs for British operations. As such, it was decided to build a further 80 of the ships in the UK and Canada to be available in the spring of 1945.

The British Staff drew up their own specification, requiring that the ship:

 Be able to embark and disembark tanks, motor transport, etc., on beaches of varying slopes; and amphibians and DD Sherman tanks into deep water
 Carry five Landing Craft Assault (LCA), or similar craft, and one LCT (5) or LCT (6) on the upper deck, in place of transport, and, as an alternative to the LCT (5), two NL pontoon causeway to be carried; the LCT (5) and NL pontoon causeways to be capable of launching directly from the upper deck.
 To carry a load of sixty tons over the main ramp and ten tons over the vehicle ramp (i.e., the  ramp from the upper deck to the bow door. After trials, this was removed from some vessels)
 To be fitted for operations in the tropics and in cold climates

Two major problems made a redesign necessary. The preferred light weight medium-speed (locomotive type) Electro-Motive Diesel 12-567 diesel engines were not immediately available. Staff wanted more power and higher speeds if possible, which the EMD engines could have provided. However, the only engines available were very heavy steam reciprocating engines from frigates that had been cancelled. These delivered two and a half times the power of the diesels. So large were they that significant changes had to be made to accommodate them. Lack of welded construction facilities meant that the hull had to be riveted. This combination of heavy hull and heavy engines meant that speed was only  faster than the LCT (2).

At the same time, other improvements were made—as well as simplifications required so most of the structure could be assembled with rivets. The cutaway hard chine that had been dropped in the American version of the Mark 2 vessels was restored. The tank deck, which was above the waterline, was made parallel to the keel, there was to be no round down to the upper deck, and the ship was enlarged to accommodate the more bulky machinery.

Provision was made for carrying the British Landing Craft Assault (LCA) in gravity davits, instead of American assault craft. Provision was also made for carrying Landing Craft Tank (LCT) and Landing Craft Mechanized (LCM), and NL pontoon causeways.

When the design commenced, engineers knew that the beaches where the ships were expected to land would be very flat, but it was not possible to produce a satisfactory vessel with a  draught forward, and very little keel slope, so the 1 in 50 keel slope was maintained. It was known that the 1:50 slope would often result in the LST grounding aft on a shallow beach, resulting in the vehicles being discharged into comparatively deep water.

Various methods had been investigated to overcome the problem, but heavy grounding skegs and the N.L. pontoon causeways were finally accepted as standard; the pontoon causeways were formed of pontoons  × 5 ft × , made up into strings and rafts. When offloading, the rafts were secured to the fore end of the ship, and the load discharged directly onto the shore, or towed on the raft to the shore.

The ships were fitted out for service in both very cold and tropical conditions. The accommodation provided for both crew and army personnel was greatly improved compared with LST (2). The main hazard, apart from enemy action, was fire on the tank deck. Fire sprinklers were provided, but the water drenching system installed in later American vessels could not be provided.

The bow door arrangements were similar to the LST (2), but the design arranged the bow ramp in two parts in an attempt to increase the number of beaches where direct discharge would be possible. The machinery for operating the bow doors and ramp were electrical, but otherwise, steam auxiliaries replaced the electrical gear on the LST (2).

The general arrangements of the tank deck were similar, but the design increased headroom and added a ramp to the top deck, as in later LST (2)s. Provision was made for carrying LCA on gravity davits instead of the American built assault boats. The arrangements were generally an improvement over the LST (2), but suffered from a deeper draught, and, to some extent, from the haste of construction.

The first orders were placed in December 1943 with British builders, and 35 with Canadian builders. Swan Hunter delivered the first ships in December 1944. During 1944, follow up orders were placed in Canada for a further 36. These programmes were in full swing when the war ended, but not all vessels were completed.

The ships were numbered numbers LST-3001 to LST-3045 and LST-3501 to LST-3534. LST−3535 and later were cancelled.

Fifteen 40-ton tanks or 27 25-ton tanks could be carried on the tank deck with an additional fourteen lorries on the weather deck.

Propulsion
The main engines were of the 4-cylinder triple expansion 4-crank type, balanced on the Yarrow-Tweedy-Slick system, the cylinders being as follows:

The piston and slide valve rods were all fitted with metallic packing to the stuffing boxes, and all pistons fitted with packing rings and springs. The high-pressure valve was of the piston type, whilst the remaining ones were of the balanced type. The main engines were designed to develop  at 185 rpm continuously.

With the ships being twin screw, the engines were fitted with a shaft coupling to the crank shaft at the forward end, allowing the engine to be turned end to end to suit either port or starboard side fitting.

Modifications for landing craft

The LCT needed lifting onto the deck of the ship, being carried on wedge-shaped support blocks; at the time of launching she was set down on the "launch ways" by simply slacking off bolts in the wedge blocks, allowing the launch way to take the weight. To carry out a launch, the LST was simply heeled over about 11 degrees by careful flooding of tanks in the hull.

This method was used for moving LCT5s from Britain to the Far East, although there seems to be no reference to LST (3)s being used, most being completed late in or after the war.

Even at the end of the war there was a need for more ships able to carry minor landing craft, and two of the LST (3)s then completing were specially fitted to carry LCM (7). They were hoisted on by means of a specially fitted 30-ton derrick; This 30-ton derrick replaced a 15-ton derrick, two of which were the standard fit of the LST (3). The 30-ton derrick was taller and generally more substantial than the 15 ton one.

The LCM (7)s were landed on trolleys fitted with hydraulic jacks. These ran on rails down each side of the deck, and were hauled to and fro by means of winches. The stowage was filled from fore to aft as each craft was jacked down onto fixed cradles between the rails. The ships completed to this standard were LST-3043/HMS Messina, and LST-3044/HMS Narvik. While these ships were able to carry LCMs, they were only able to carry out loading and unloading operations under nearly ideal weather conditions, and therefore could not be used for assault operations; they also lacked the facilities to maintain the landing craft (which the Dock Landing Ships provided).

A pair of Scripps marine conversions of Ford V8 engines gave it speeds of  unloaded,  service speed,  on one engine. Armament was typically a Bren light machine gun aft; with two Lewis Guns in a port forward position.

The LCM (7)s that were carried on the LST (2) were considerably larger,  in length,  beam, with a hoisting weight of 28 tons, full load displacement of 63 tons.

Variants
Some LST (3)s were converted to LST (A) (A for "assault") by adding stiffening so they could safely carry the heaviest British tanks.

Two LST (3)s were converted to command vessels, LST (C): LST 3043 and LST 3044. Post war they became HMS Messina (L112) and HMS Narvik (L114). They were better armed with ten 20 mm Oerlikons and four 40 mm Bofors.

Two LST (3)s were converted during building into Headquarters command ships LST (Q). These were L3012, which became L3101 (and later HMS Ben Nevis) and LST 3013, which became LST 3102, and then HMS Ben Lomond. They acted as LST "mother ships", similar in most aspects to American ships based on the LST (2) hull. They had two Quonset huts erected on the main deck to accommodate 40 officers. Berths on the tank deck berthed an extra 196 men. A bake shop and 16 refrigeration boxes for fresh provisions augmented the facilities normally provided for the crew. Four extra distilling units were added, and the ballast tanks were converted for the storage of fresh water.

Service in World War II

At the Armor Training School in Ft. Knox, Kentucky, buildings were erected as exact mock-ups of an LST. Tank crews in training learned how to maneuver their vehicles onto, in and from an LST with these facilities. One of these buildings has been preserved at Ft. Knox for historic reasons and can still be seen.

From their combat début in the Solomon Islands in June 1943 until the end of the hostilities in August 1945, the LSTs performed a vital service in World War II. They participated in the invasions of Sicily (Operation Husky), Italy, Normandy, and southern France in the European Theater and were an essential element in the island-hopping campaigns in the Pacific that culminated in the liberation of the Philippines and the capture of Iwo Jima and Okinawa.

Despite the large numbers produced, LSTs were a scarce commodity and Churchill describes the difficulty in retaining sufficient LSTs in the Mediterranean for amphibious work in Italy, and later the logistics of moving large numbers to the eastern theatres, while still supplying the large armies in Europe.

The LST proved to be a remarkably versatile ship. Thirty-nine of them were converted to become landing craft repair ships (ARL). In this design, the bow ramp and doors were removed, and the bow was sealed. Derricks, booms, and winches were added to haul damaged landing craft on board for repairs, and blacksmith, machine, and electrical workshops were provided on the main deck and tank deck.

Thirty-six LSTs were converted to serve as small hospital ships and designated LSTH. They supplemented the many standard LSTs, which removed casualties from the beach after landing tanks and vehicles. LSTs had brought 41,035 wounded men back across the English Channel from Normandy by D-Day+114 (28 September 1944). Other LSTs, provided with extra cranes and handling gear, were used exclusively for replenishing ammunition. They possessed a special advantage in this role, as their size permitted two or three LSTs to go simultaneously alongside an anchored battleship or cruiser to accomplish replenishment more rapidly than standard ammunition ships.

Three LST (2) were converted into British "Fighter Direction Tenders" (FDT), swapping their landing craft for Motor Launches and outfitted with AMES Type 11 and Type 15 fighter control radar to provide Ground-controlled interception (GCI) coverage for air defence of the D-Day landing areas. Of these ships, HMS FDT 216 was stationed off Omaha and Utah beaches, HMS FDT 217 was allocated Sword, Juno, and Gold beaches. HMS FDT 13 was used for coverage of the overall main shipping channel. In the period 6 June to 26 June Allied fighters controlled by the FDTs resulted in the destruction of 52 enemy aircraft by day, and 24 enemy aircraft by night.

In the latter stages of World War II, some LSTs were fitted with flight decks that could launch small observation planes during amphibious operations. Two others (USS LST-393 and USS LST-776) were fitted with the Brodie System for take off and landing.

It has been estimated that, in the combined fleets assembled for the war on Japan, the tonnage of landing ships, excluding landing craft, would have exceeded five million tons and nearly all built within four years.

Throughout the war, LSTs demonstrated a remarkable capacity to absorb punishment and survive. Despite the sobriquets "Large Slow Target" and "Large Stationary Target," which were applied to them by crew members, the LSTs suffered few losses in proportion to their number and the scope of their operations. Their brilliantly conceived structural arrangement provided unusual strength and buoyancy;  was struck and holed in a post-war collision with a Victory ship and survived. Although the LST was considered a valuable target by the enemy, only 26 were lost due to enemy action, and a mere 13 were the victims of weather, reef, or accident.

A total of 1,152 LSTs were contracted for in the great naval building program of World War II, but 101 were cancelled in the fall of 1942 because of shifting construction priorities. Of 1,051 actually constructed, 113 LSTs were transferred to Britain under the terms of Lend-Lease, and four more were turned over to the Greek Navy. Conversions to other ship types with different hull designations accounted for 116: 6 Miscellaneous Ships (AG), 14 Motor Torpedo Boat Tenders (AGP), 7 Self-Propelled Barracks Ships (APB), 13 Battle Damage Repair Ships (ARB), 39 Landing Craft Repair Ships (ARL), 3 Salvage Craft Tenders (ARST), 4 Aircraft Repair Ships (ARVA, ARVE), 1 Advance Aviation Base Ship (AVB), 4 Unclassified miscellaneous vessels (IX), and 36 LSTH. One LST which had been sunk in an accident was later raised and converted into a Covered Barge (YF).

Post-war developments

United States

The end of World War II left the Navy with a huge inventory of amphibious ships. Hundreds of these were scrapped or sunk, and most of the remaining ships were put in "mothballs" to be preserved for the future. Additionally, many of the LSTs were demilitarized and sold to the private sector, along with thousands of other transport ships, contributing to a major downturn in shipbuilding in the United States following the war. Many LSTs were used as targets in aquatic nuclear testing after the war, being readily available and serving no apparent military applications. World War II era LSTs have become somewhat ubiquitous, and have found a number of novel commercial uses, including operating as small freighters, ferries, and dredges. Consequently, construction of LSTs in the immediate post-war years was modest. LST-1153 and LST-1154, commissioned respectively in 1947 and 1949, were the only steam-driven LSTs ever built by the Navy. They provided improved berthing arrangements and a greater cargo capacity than their predecessors.

The success of the amphibious assault at Inchon during the Korean War showed the utility of LSTs once again. This was in contrast with the earlier opinion expressed by many military authorities that the advent of the atomic bomb had relegated amphibious landings to a thing of the past. During the Korean War a number of LSTs were converted to transport the much needed, but slow and short range LSU from the United States to the Korean theater of war using the piggy-back method. After arrival the LSU was slid off sideways from the LST. Additionally, LSTs were used for transport in the building of an Air Force base at Thule, Greenland during the Korean War. Fifteen LSTs of what were later to be known as the Terrebonne Parish class were constructed in the early 1950s. Three-inch / 50-caliber twin mounts replaced the old twin 40 mm guns, and controllable pitch propellers improved the ship's backing power. On 1 July 1955, county or, in the case of Louisiana, parish names were assigned to many LSTs, which up to then had borne only a letter-number hull designation.

In the late 1950s, seven LSTs of the De Soto County class were constructed. These were an improved version over earlier LSTs, with a high degree of habitability for the crew and embarked troops.

United Kingdom

Commercial ferry use 

In 1946, a brand new concept of transport was developed in the UK. During World War II, the great potential of landing ships and craft was recognised; if it was possible to drive tanks, guns and lorries directly onto a beach, then theoretically the same landing craft could be used to carry out a similar operation in the civilian commercial market, providing there were reasonable port facilities. From this idea grew the worldwide roll-on/roll-off ferry industry. In the period between the world wars, Lt. Colonel Frank Bustard formed the Atlantic Steam Navigation Company, with a view to cheap transatlantic travel. This never materialised, but he observed trials on Brighton Sands of a LST in 1943 when its peacetime capabilities were obvious.

In the spring of 1946, the company approached the Admiralty with a request to purchase three of these vessels. The Admiralty was unwilling to sell, but after negotiations agreed to let the ASN have the use of three vessels on bareboat charter at a rate of £13 6s 8d per day. These vessels were LSTs 3519, 3534, and 3512.

The chartered vessels had to be adapted for their new role. First the accommodation on board had to be improved, and alterations in the engine and boiler rooms had also to be made. Modified funnels and navigational aids needed to be provided before they could enter service. On the morning of 11 September 1946, the first voyage of the Atlantic Steam Navigation Company took place when Empire Baltic sailed from Tilbury to Rotterdam with a full load of 64 vehicles for the Dutch government. On arrival at Waalhaven, the vessel beached using the method employed during wartime landings, being held by a stern anchor. The vessel stayed on the beach overnight, returning at 08:00 the next morning. This leisurely pace of work was followed for the first few voyages, the beach being employed possibly because normal port facilities were unavailable due to wartime damage. Following the initial Rotterdam voyage, ASN used their new vessels to transfer thousands of vehicles for the British Army from Tilbury to Hamburg, and later to Antwerp in 1955.

The original three LSTs were joined in 1948 by another vessel, renamed Empire Doric, after the ASN were able to convince commercial operators to support the new route between Preston Dock in Lancashire and the Northern Ireland port of Larne. Originally Liverpool was chosen, but opposition from other operators led to a move to Lancashire. However, special port facilities had to be constructed at both Preston and Larne before the new route could be opened – a wartime end-loading ramp built by engineers during World War II at Preston, and a floating pontoon from a Mulberry harbour connected via a bridge to the quay at Larne.

The first sailing of this new route was on 21 May 1948 by Empire Cedric. After the inaugural sailing, Empire Cedric continued on the Northern Ireland service, offering initially a twice-weekly service. Empire Cedric  was the first vessel of the ASN fleet to hold a Passenger Certificate, and was allowed to carry fifty passengers. Thus Empire Cedric became the first vessel in the world to operate as a commercial/passenger roll-on/roll-off ferry, and the ASN became the first company to offer this type of service.

Some of the first cargo on this service were two lorry-loads of 65 gas cookers each on behalf of Moffats of Blackburn, believed to be the first commercial vehicles carried in this way as freight. The Preston–Larne service continued to expand, so much so that in 1950 it added a route to Belfast. This service opened in 1950, and sailings out of Preston were soon increased to six or seven a week to either Belfast or Larne.

In 1954, the British Transport Commission (BTC) took over the ASN under the Labour government's nationalization policy. The Hamburg service was terminated in 1955, and a new service was opened between Antwerp and Tilbury. The fleet of seven ships was to be split up, with the usual three ships based at Tilbury and the others maintaining the Preston to Northern Ireland service.

During late 1956, the entire fleet of ASN was taken over for use in the Mediterranean during the Suez Crisis, and the drive on/drive off services were not re-established until January 1957. At this point ASN were made responsible for the management of twelve Admiralty LST (3)s brought out of reserve as a result of the Suez Crisis, though too late to see service.

Army service 

A major task at the end of World War II was the redistribution of stores and equipment worldwide. Due to the scarcity and expense of merchant shipping it was decided in 1946 that the Royal Army Service Corps civilian fleet should take over seven LSTs from the Royal Navy. These were named after distinguished corps officers: Evan Gibb, Charles Macleod, Maxwell Brander, Snowden Smith, Humfrey Gale, Reginald Kerr, and Fredrick Glover.

The LSTs needed to comply with Board of Trade regulations, and to be brought up to merchant navy standards, which involved lengthy alterations including extra accommodation. On completion, five vessels sailed for the Middle East, and two for the Far East.

During the evacuation of Mandatory Palestine, Humfrey Gale and Evan Gibb made fifteen voyages each between Haifa and Port Said lifting between them 26,000 tons of vehicles and stores.

Similar work was done worldwide until 1952 when the ships were handed over to the Atlantic Steam Navigation Company, and subsequently in 1961 to the British-India Steam Navigation Company, tasked by the War Office directly, RASC having no further concern with their administration.

Aviation training 

The rapid increase in the use of helicopters in the Royal Navy in the late 1950s and 1960s required an increase in the training and support facilities ashore and afloat. Operational training for aircrew was carried out by naval air stations at Portland and Culdrose. The scrapping of some carriers and conversion of others to commando carriers in the mid-1950s left a shortage of suitable decks. In the meantime it was decided to convert LST 3027 to serve as an interim training ship.

This work was carried out at Devonport Dockyard in 1964. The deck forward of the cargo hatch was cleared of all obstructions, and strengthened for helicopter use. A small deckhouse used to support the gun emplacements was retained, although no guns were fitted, and it was used by the Flight Deck Officer as a helicopter control position. Below deck, two  aviation fuel tanks were installed at the fore end of the tank deck, and refuelling positions provided at the fore end of the flight deck. The tanks were sealed off by a bulkhead and the rest of the space used for stores, workshops and accommodation. Finally the bow doors were sealed, as they would no longer be needed. The flight deck was large enough for two Westland Wessex helicopters with rotors turning, or six could be parked with rotors folded. Renamed  she proved extremely useful in service, and many lessons were learned that would be incorporated into Engadine.

Notable incidents

World War II
 sank 18 July 1943 by torpedo from Japanese submarine Ro-106 off the Solomon Islands. Artist McClelland Barclay was killed during the attack.
 sank 15 August 1943 by aerial torpedo off Cani Rocks, Tunisia.
 destroyed 25 September 1943 by 2 bombs while unloading at Ruravai Beach, towed to Rendova and declared a total loss. Casualties were 10 killed, 20 wounded, and 5 missing.
 sank 30 September 1943 by aerial torpedo off the coast of Corsica.
 damaged 1 October 1943 by dive bombers off Vella Lavella, Solomons, killing 15. She sank 5 October 1943 while under tow by tug .
 sank 26 January 1944 after hitting a mine off Anzio, Italy.
 sank 16 February 1944 after hitting mine near Anzio, Italy.
 sank 20 February 1944 by torpedo from U-230 near Shingle, Anzio, Italy.
 sank 20 February 1944 by torpedoes from U-410, about 22 miles from Gaeta, Italy, killing 24.
 sank 20 February 1944 by a mine or torpedo on trip from Maddalena to Bastia, Sardinia.
 sank 2 March 1944 by torpedo from U-744 in Biscay Bay area.
 damaged 24 April 1944 by a storm in the Mediterranean, beached off Baia, Italy, not repaired.
During Exercise Tiger practice for an amphibious landing on 28 April 1944, German E-boats attacked a convoy in Lyme Bay. Two LSTs were sunk (LST-531 and ) by torpedoes and two more damaged with 729 US army and navy personnel killed and missing.
In the West Loch disaster on 21 May 1944  exploded while moored in West Loch at Pearl Harbor, Hawaii. This caused explosions on other LSTs. LST-39,  and  sank and others damaged. The explosions killed 163 sailors and wounded 396.
 sank 9 June 1944 by torpedo off the coast of Normandy, 67 were killed.
USS LST-523 hit a mine on 19 June 1944, at Utah Beach. The blast split the LST in two. She lost 94 men of the 300th Combat Engineers and 41 of her crew.
 sank 15 August 1944 by glider bomb off of St. Raphael, Southern France.
  wrecked 18 October 1944 by a storm while anchored at Leghorn, Italy, on 6 December a storm caused further damage to the still-grounded ship.
 sank 7 November 1944 after hitting a mine off Ostend. At least 292 persons were killed, with the total loss of life probably being over 320.
 sank 17 November 1944 after hitting a mine on a trip from Rouen, France, to Portland, England.
 heavily damaged 15 December 1944 by a kamikaze attack off Mindoro, Philippines, the next morning she was sunk by destroyer . The attack saw no ship fatalities, only injuries.
 sank 20 December 1944 by torpedo while under tow off Spain. Two crewmen were lost.
, . and  sank 21 December 1944 from aircraft and kamikaze attacka off Mindoro, Philippines.
HM LST-364 sank 22 February 1945 by torpedo by two-man mini U-boat off Ramsgate, England.
HM LST-80 sank 20 March 1945 after hitting two mines in English Channel near Ostend, Belgium.
 sank 7 April 1945 after a kamikaze attack off Okinawa.

Post-war
USS LST-52 participated in Operation Crossroads, the atomic bomb tests at Bikini Atoll in July 1946, as a target.
 sank in a storm in 1948 while under tow to a scrap yard, hulk remains near the beach in Rodanthe, North Carolina.
 (as Egyptian Navy ENS Aka) sunk 1 November 1956 by a British air strike during the Suez crisis.
 sunk in 1979 as an artificial reef near the U.S. Virgin Islands.
 (as Vietnam People's Navy armed transport HQ-505) sank 14 March 1988 during the Johnson South Reef Skirmish with China.

World War II survivors

Indonesia 

 KRI Teluk Ratai (509), ex-USS LST-678, is a museum ship in Pariaman, West Sumatra
 KRI Teluk Bone (511), ex-USS Iredell County (LST-839), was decommissioned by the Indonesian Navy on 15 August 2019

Philippines 
The Philippine Navy received 20+ units of the LST Mk.2 starting in the late 1940s. This includes BRP Laguna (LT-501), ex-USS LST-230 and BRP Benguet (LT-507), ex-USS Daviess County (LST-692). The BRP Sierra Madre (LT-57), ex-USS Harnett County (LST-821) permanently beached on the Second Thomas Shoal. The ship serves as an advance outpost, and is currently at the center of a territorial dispute between China and the Philippines.

Singapore 

RSS Resolution (L-204), ex-USS LST-649, is operated by the Republic of Singapore Navy as a training ship at Tuas Naval Base, Singapore.

South Korea 
 was commissioned in 1945 and was an active ship until 2006. She served in the Okinawa campaign in May–June 1945 and earned one battle star for her service in World War II. She was transferred to the Republic of Korea Navy in 1958, commissioned as ROKS Wi Bong (LST-676), and served there until 2006. She was used to transport thousands of soldiers and their equipment from South Korea to South Vietnam during the Vietnam War. In 2007, she was decommissioned and sold to the city of Gunsan, South Korea for display in a maritime museum in a deal with the navy.

Taiwan 

The Republic of China Navy Currently Operates 5 LST-542 Class vessels, as well as decommissioning 1 as of recent.

 ROCS Chung Chien (LST-205),ex-USS LST-716, is active with the Republic of China Navy as of 2022
 ROCS Chung Chie (LST-218), ex-USS Berkeley County (LST-279), is active with the Republic of China Navy as of 2022
 ROCS Chung Ming (LST-227), ex-USS Sweetwater County (LST-1152), is active with the Republic of China Navy as of 2022
 ROCS Chung Yeh (LST-231), ex-USS Sublette County (LST-1144), is active with the Republic of China Navy as of 2022
 ROCS Kao Hsiung (LCC-1), ex-USS Dukes County (LST-735), is in service as a Testbed for the Republic of China Navy as of 2022.
 ROCS Chung Shun (LST-208), ex-USS LST-732, was decommissioned by the Republic of China Navy on 1 April 2021

Thailand 

 HTMS Pangan (LST-713), ex-, is a museum ship in Surat Thani
 HTMS Lanta (LST-714), ex-, is a museum ship in Krabi

Vietnam 

Tran Khanh Du (HQ-501), ex-, had been transferred to the Republic of Vietnam Navy, and after the Fall of Saigon was captured by North Vietnamese forces. , she is active and in commission with the Vietnamese People's Navy.

United States 
 , ex-RHS Syros (L-144), is a museum ship in Evansville, Indiana.
  is a museum ship in Muskegon, Michigan.
 MV Cape Henlopen, ex-, was converted to a passenger and auto ferry and operates between New London, Connecticut, and Orient Point, on the East End of Long Island, New York.

Modern developments

To obtain that speed, the traditional blunt bow doors of the LST were replaced by a pointed ship bow. Unloading is accomplished through the use of a  ramp operated over the bow (similar in concept to the original HMS Boxer) and supported by twin derrick arms. A stern gate to the tank deck permits unloading of LVTs into the water or the unloading of other vehicles into a landing craft utility (LCU) or onto a pier. Capable of operating with high-speed amphibious squadrons consisting of LHAs, LPDs, and LSDs, the Newport-class LST can transport tanks, other heavy vehicles, and engineering equipment that cannot readily be landed by helicopters or landing craft. The Newport type were removed U.S. Navy service in the 1990s, and Spanish Navy, Chile, Australia, and Malaysia but serves on in the navies of Brazil, Mexico, Morocco, Taiwan, in a modified form and soon with Peru.

Elsewhere, over 100 Polish s were produced from 1967 to 2002.

Operators

  operates two s.
  operates four s.
  operates six s.
  operates one , purchased from the United States, and one , purchased from the United Kingdom.
  operates two s, purchased from France.
  operates, 12 Yuhai-class landing ships, 10 Yubei-class landing ships, 10 Yunshu-class landing ships, 1 Yudeng-class landing ship, 4 Yuting-class landing ships, 10 Yuting II-class landing ships, and 15 Yuting III-class landing ships.
  operates 2 s and 4 s, all purchased from the United States. 
  operates a single , purchased from France.
  operates two s.
  operates a single , purchased from the United States.
  operates three s.
  operates one .
  operates a single , purchased from France.
  operates five s.
 🇮🇳 Indian Navy operates two s, four s, and three s.
  operates nine s, 11 s, four s, and an post-war Japanese-built LST-542-class tank landing ship.
  operates four s and four s.
  Islamic Revolutionary Guard Corps Navy operates three s and two s.
  operates two s.
  operates four s and four s.
  operates one .
  operates three s, purchased from France.
  operates two s, purchased from the United States.
  operates one , one , both purchased from the United States, and two s.
  operates five s.
  operates 15 s, two s, and two s.
  operates three s.
  operates two s.
  operates two s and the TCG Osman Gazi
  operates a single .
  operates three s.
  operates eight s.
  operates four s.
  operates three s and two s, captured from South Vietnam.
  operates a single .

Former operators

  decommissioned its last LST, ARA Cabo San Antonio in 1997.
  decommissioned its only  in 2013.
  decommissioned its last  in 2017.
  decommissioned all its LST's following World War II.
  decommissioned its only  in 1998.
  decommissioned its last s, following the dissolution of its navy in 1993.
  decommissioned its last  in 2017.
  decommissioned its 14  following German reunification.
  lost its two s during the Gulf War at the Battle of Bubiyan.
  decommissioned its last  in 1992.
  decommissioned its last  in 2002.
  lost its only  due to a fire in 2009.
  decommissioned its lone  in 1991, following the collapse of the government.
  transferred its four remaining s to The Philippines in 1975.
  decommissioned its last  in 2012.
  Royal Fleet Auxiliary decommissioned its last  in 2008.
  decommissioned its last  in 2000.
  two s were captured by Croatia in 1992.

Cultural references

Literature
Jonah's Cathedral by R. D. Wall, is a novel of the Vietnam War based on the author's experiences while serving on an LST in the Mekong Delta in 1966. The book, #1 in the Jonah Wynchester Series, follows the exploits of U.S. Navy Gunner's Mate Jonah Wynchester from the time he reports aboard his new assignment, the LST USS Winchester County, at the Navy Amphibious Base in Little Creek, Virginia, on New Year's Day 1966 through the time the ship departs for Vietnam. The "Cathedral" refers to the nickname the crew have given the ship, a decrepit, run-down LST in the ready reserve fleet, that is suddenly re-activated and fully manned for the rapidly expanding need for LSTs in the Vietnam theater. Book #2, "Mekong Covenant" follows the ship across the Pacific into the deadly brown waters of the Mekong Delta.

The Ninety and Nine by William Brinkley, author of Don't Go Near the Water, portrays an LST running supplies to Anzio during World War II. The title refers to the ship's company of ninety enlisted men and nine officers. The book opens with a quotation attributed to Winston Churchill – "The destinies of two great empires ... seemed to be tied by some god-damned things called LST's."

In the biography Man In Motion: Michigan's Legendary Senate Majority Leader, Emil Lockwood by Stanley C. Fedewa and Marilyn H. Fedewa, Lockwood colorfully describes his World War II service aboard LST-478. "We were always in the thick of it," Emil said, "because it was our job on the LSTs to carry personnel-operated tanks, artillery, supplies—anything, you name it—into the heart of a war zone."

The novel Warm Bodies by Donald R. Morris portrays life on an LST in the 1950s. The title refers to the use of any available body in port during overhaul for any duty necessary. "A Warm Body is man with at least one arm and two fingers who can pick up something when he is told to." Although a work of fiction, the novel is based on Morris' experience as an officer aboard an LST.

See also

 Altalena Affair – a decommissioned LST used to transport weapons to Israel was involved in a firefight between the Israel Defense Forces and a Jewish paramilitary group in June 1948
 Landing craft tank
 List of amphibious warfare ships
 List of LSTs
 LSTH
 Rhino ferry
 West Loch Disaster
 Dyugon-class landing craft

References

Notes

Bibliography
 
 
 
 *

External links

 HMS Misoa – Landing Ship Tank (LST)
 Ship Tour LST325 in Evansville, Indiana
 DANFS: Tank Landing Ships (LST)
 NavSource Online: Tank Landing Ship (LST) Index
 InsideLST.com – a selection of information on the construction, complement, &c of LSTs, mostly taken from LST-325
 United States LST Association website
 The American Amphibious Forces Association – information about later classes of LSTs
 History of LSTs including description of LSTs in use as aircraft carriers etc.
 The US LST Ship Memorial – A preserved and operational LST from World War II – LST 325
 LST Story Film: the building and launch of Tank Landing Ship Coconino County (LST-603) during World War II.

 
 
Amphibious warfare vessels
Landing craft
LST-542-class tank landing ships
Military vehicles introduced from 1940 to 1944
Ship classes of the French Navy